Oliver Harlan Cross (July 13, 1868 – April 24, 1960) was a U.S. Representative from Texas.

Born in Eutaw, Alabama, Cross attended the public schools and was graduated from the University of Alabama at Tuscaloosa in 1891.
He was a teacher in the public schools at Union Springs, Alabama, in 1891 and 1892.
He studied law.
He was admitted to the bar in 1893 and commenced practice in Deming, New Mexico.
He moved to McGregor, Texas, in 1894 and continued the practice of law.
He served as city attorney of McGregor in 1895 and 1896.
He moved to Waco, Texas, in 1896 and continued the practice of law.
He served as assistant attorney of McLennan County, Texas 1898-1902.
He served as member of the State house of representatives in 1900.
He served as district attorney of McLennan County 1902-1906.
He retired from law practice in 1917 and assumed agricultural pursuits.

Cross was elected as a Democrat to the Seventy-first and to the three succeeding Congresses (March 4, 1929 – January 3, 1937).
He was not a candidate for renomination in 1936.
He engaged in agricultural pursuits and in real-estate activities.
He died in Waco, Texas, April 24, 1960.
He was interred in Hearne Cemetery, Hearne, Texas.

Sources

1868 births
1960 deaths
Democratic Party members of the Texas House of Representatives
County district attorneys in Texas
People from Eutaw, Alabama
People from McGregor, Texas
University of Alabama alumni
Democratic Party members of the United States House of Representatives from Texas